Woodsia neomexicana, the New Mexican cliff fern, is a fern species native to the Southwestern United States and northern Mexico.

Distribution
The core of its range is in Coahuila, Nuevo León, Zacatecas, New Mexico, southeastern Utah, Arizona, western Texas and southern Colorado, with isolated populations reported from Oklahoma and South Dakota. The plant usually grows in cracks in the sides of cliffs, on top of rocks, etc.

Description
Woodsia neomexicana has stems that are largely obscured by the persistent bases of scales and dead leaf bases. Leaves are up to 30 cm long, pinnate with pinnatifid pinnules (leaflets) with scattered hairs.

The indusia have narrow, thread-like segments. Spores average about 50 μm in diameter.

References

neomexicana
Ferns of Mexico
Ferns of the United States
Flora of the South-Central United States
Flora of the Southwestern United States
Flora of Colorado
Flora of Oklahoma
Flora of South Dakota
Flora without expected TNC conservation status